The Black Album is the fourth studio album by English punk rock band the Damned, and the first to feature Paul Gray on bass guitar. It was released on 3 November 1980 by Chiswick as a double album, with "Curtain Call" filling the whole of side 3, and a selection of live tracks recorded at Shepperton Studios at a special concert for Damned fan club members on side 4. The song "13th Floor Vendetta" paid tribute to the film The Abominable Dr. Phibes (1971), opening with the lyrics "...the organ plays to midnight on Maldine Square tonight".

Music
The Black Album represented a change in the career of the group and an expansion of their sound. AllMusic critic Ned Raggett noted that "some of the numbers show the band following their original punk vein, but by this point the four...were leaving straight, three-chord thrash to the cul-de-sac revivalists", and that it was "a chance for the band to try everything from straightforward rock to gentler atmospherics". Raggett described "Wait for the Blackout" as a "dramatic psych/punk surge" with "overtly-serious goth affectations", and qualified "Drinking About My Baby" as "goofy but still enjoyable". Captain Sensible later said that Dave Vanian's vocals were moving to a darker direction, and stated "It is goth; we didn't set out to do that but that is just the way it is. He did have a hearse, he was a gravedigger".

Reissues
The Damned's Chiswick back catalogue was acquired by Big Beat in 1981, and The Black Album was reissued in August 1982 as a single album that omitted "Curtain Call" and the live tracks. The artwork for the reissue parodied the sleeve of the Beatles' The White Album, rendered in black with no details other than the group's name embossed in capitals. "It was said that the Beatles had their White Album, we had our Black Album", said Vanian. "The sleeve isn't related to the Beatles in any way". However, Scabies said: "Of course it was to do with the Beatles, I was so sick about the debates of what we should have on the front of it. I said: 'Put the thing in a plain black sleeve and we'll have a go at the Beatles and The White Album'''". The live tracks were reissued in their own right, with four extra tracks, as Live Shepperton 1980.

The first subsequent reissue of The Black Album on CD reinstated "Curtain Call" and the original artwork, and the 2005 double-CD reissue also reinstated the live tracks.

Tour
The 28-date Black Album UK tour began in November 1980, with reformed 1970s street punk band the Straps as support.

Critical reception

In a retrospective review for AllMusic, critic Ned Raggett called the album hit-or-miss, but added that "tracks of note are still thick on the ground" and that "it's still a surprisingly good blast, a tour de force for Vanian particularly".

Track listing

Note
 The song titled "Second Time Around" was also known as "Machine Gun Etiquette", the title track from the band's previous album.

2005 deluxe edition
Disc one
The first disc contains the 12 tracks from side one to side three of the original release. 
Disc two
The second disc contains the 6 tracks from side four of the original release plus 9 bonus tracks. 

Notes
 "White Rabbit" – produced by the Damned and Roger Armstrong at Wessex Studios, London, April 1980; engineered by Tony Taverner; mixing on "White Rabbit" extended version engineered by Robin Black; released as a single in France and Germany only but available in the UK on import in July 1980.
 "Rabid (Over You)" and "Seagulls" – produced by the Damned at Wessex Studios, February 1980; recording and mixing on "Rabid (Over You)" engineered by Gary Edwards; "Seagulls" engineered by Alvin Clark; synthesizer on "Rabid (Over You)" by Anthony More; B-sides to "White Rabbit". 
 "The History of the World (Part 1)" single version'' – sound effects recorded at Nova Suite, London, August 1980; overdubs and mixing engineered by Steve Rance; released on 22 September 1980.
 "I Believe the Impossible" and "Sugar and Spite" – recorded by Captain Sensible and Rat Scabies (lead vocals on "I Believe the Impossible" by Captain Sensible); recording date and location unknown; B-sides to "The History of the World (Part 1)".
 "There Ain't No Sanity Clause" – produced by the Damned at Rockfield Studios, May–June 1980; released as a single on 24 November 1980.
 "Looking at You" – recorded live at Shepperton Studios, 26 July 1980; B-side to "There Ain't No Sanity Clause".

Personnel 

Credits adapted from the 2005 edition liner notes.

The Damned
 Dave Vanianlead vocals (all but 3), backing vocals (10),  harmonium (12)
 Captain Sensibleelectric and acoustic guitars, keyboards, backing and lead (3) vocals 
 Paul Graybass
 Rat Scabiesdrums, rhythm guitar (4), backing vocals (4)
Additional musicians
 Hanz Zimmersynthesizer (2, 9)
 Ray Martineztrumpet (5, 7)
 Hugh Jonesbacking vocals (10)
Technical
 The Damnedproducer (all but 9)
 Hanz Zimmerproducer (9)
 Hugh Jonesengineer 
 Dave Vanianartwork concept, design
 Allan Ballardphotography
 H. Leadbitterdesign execution

References

External links

The Damned (band) albums
1980 albums
Chiswick Records albums
Albums recorded at Rockfield Studios